Silver Ladder is an album by American singer/songwriter Peter Mulvey, released in 2014.

Silver Ladder was the first album released by Mulvey after a five-year hiatus from songwriting due to personal issues. He decided to write one song a week and collected enough to record the album. The basic tracks were recorded live over two-and-a-half days followed by overdubs.

Reception

Writing for the Irish Times, Joe Breen called the album "impressive" and wrote that although Mulvey "can go overboard... he compensates." Martin Chilton of The Telegraph called the album "grown-up country" and wrote that Mulvey had excelled himself. Jason Noble of CultureFly called the album "not a bad return, but it’s not likely to set the world on fire" and wrote "The songs are decent enough, but do suffer from a lack of impact at times, and a little more variation would help..."

The Milwaukee Journal Sentinel placed the album 7th in its year-end review of the top 10 best albums of 2014 in Milwaukee.

Track listing
All songs by Peter Mulvey unless noted.
 "Lies You Forgot You Told" – 2:24
 "You Don't Have to Tell Me" – 2:29
 "Sympathies" – 2:32
 "Remember the Milkman?" (Mulvey, Matt Lorenz) – 2:47
 "What Else Was It?" – 3:40
 "Trempealeau" – 3:15
 "Where Did You Go?" (Mulvey, David Goodrich, Barry Rothman) – 3:41
 "Josephine" – 2:58	
 "Back in the Wind" (Mulvey, Paul Cebar) – 2:55	
 "Copenhagen Airport" – 2:25
 "If You Shoot at a King You Must Kill Him" – 4:25
 "Landfall" – 1:07

Personnel
Peter Mulvey - vocals, acoustic guitar
Anita Suhanin – vocals
Sara Watkins – violin, vocals
James DePrato – guitar
Tom Freund – bass
Aidan Hawken – guitar, keyboards, vocals
David Kemper – drums
Phil Parlapiano – accordion
Chuck Prophet – drums, guitar, vocals

Production notes
Aidan Hawken – producer
Chuck Prophet – producer
 Dan Burns – engineer, mixing
 Ian Kennedy – mastering
 Andy Plaisted – engineer
 Meghan Dewar – design
 Hartwig Kopp-Delaney – cover photo

References

2014 albums
Peter Mulvey albums